Michaela "Milva" Kalogerakou  (born 10 July 1998) is a Greek female water polo player. She played for Olympiacos, with whom she won the 2014–15 LEN Euro League Women and the 2014 Women's LEN Trophy. She was part of the Greece women's team winning the bronze medal at the 2015 European Games in Baku. She started competing in water polo in 2013.

References

External links
 at Baku 2015

1998 births
Living people
Greek female water polo players
Place of birth missing (living people)
Olympiacos Women's Water Polo Team players
Water polo players at the 2015 European Games
European Games bronze medalists for Greece
European Games medalists in water polo
Water polo players from Athens
21st-century Greek women